Hasty is an unincorporated community in Wright County, Minnesota, United States.  The community is near the junction of Interstate 94 and Wright County Road 8. Hasty is within Clearwater Township and Silver Creek Township.

Nearby places include Clearwater, Monticello, Silver Creek, Maple Lake, and Lake Maria State Park. Wright County Road 75 and 150th Street NW are also in the immediate area.

History
Hasty was platted in about 1895, and named for Warren Hasty, the original owner of the town site. A post office called Hasty was established in 1888, and remained in operation until 1954.

References

Unincorporated communities in Minnesota
Unincorporated communities in Wright County, Minnesota